The 1982 Trans-Am Series was the seventeenth running of the Sports Car Club of America's premier series. All races ran for approximately one hundred miles. The successful Datsun brand saw its final Trans Am victory in 1982, although the Nissan brand which replaced it did see notable success thereafter.

Results

Championships

Drivers
Elliot Forbes-Robinson – 147 points
Doc Bundy – 92 points
Phil Currin – 92 points
Tom Gloy – 72 points
Darrin Brassfield – 49 points
Rob McFarlin – 44 points

Manufacturers
Pontiac – 65 points
Chevrolet – 42 points
Porsche – 37 points
Ford – 22 points
Datsun – 16 points

References

Trans-Am Series
Trans-Am